Josep María Ferré Ybarz (born 26 November 1983), commonly known as Coco, is a Spanish football manager. He most recently coached the Philippines national team.

Coaching career
Ferré began his coaching career in the academy of CE Europa. Subsequently, he worked in the academy of CE Premià before working in FC Barcelona Escola.

Buriram United
After working with FCB Escola, he went to Thailand where he worked as academy director in Buriram United where he also coached the "B" team.

Ratchaburi Mitr Phol
In 2015, Ferré coached Ratchaburi Mitr Phol. He lead the team to a seventh-place finish, failing to secure a spot in the 2016 AFC Champions League Qualifying play-off. At the end of the season, his contract was not renewed.

Bangkok Glass
In 2016, Ferré was appointed as the assistant coach of Aurelio Vidmar in Bangkok Glass. Following the departure of Vidmar in the mid-season, he remained as the assistant coach of Surachai Jaturapattarapong, who took over as the interim head coach. Ferré was appointed as head coach for the following season. In 2018, he was sacked by the club as a result of Bangkok's dismal run of results, which included only seven points in seven games.

Bayamón
In September 2018, he was appointed as head coach in Bayamón which plays at Liga Puerto Rico.

East Bengal
In 2019, he has been appointed as an assistant coach and video analyst of Alejandro Menéndez in East Bengal which plays in I-League. On 21 January 2020, he left the club.

Ascó
In May 2022, it was announced that Ferré was appointed as the head coach of Catalan club, FC Ascó. In November 2022, the club and Ferré himself have mutually agreed for his departure.

Philippines
On December 8, 2022, the Philippines national football team, more commonly known as the Azkals, announced Ferré as its new head coach. Having appointed on short notice, Ferre failed to lead the Philippines to the semifinals of the 2022 AFF Championship. Prior to that campaign Ferre's team yielded a 0–1 lose to a friendly against Vietnam.

Managerial statistics

References

1983 births
Living people
Sportspeople from Barcelona
Spanish football managers
Josep Ferre
Josep Ferre
Josep Ferre
Philippines national football team managers
Josep Ferre
Spanish expatriate football managers
Spanish expatriate sportspeople in Puerto Rico
Spanish expatriate sportspeople in Thailand
Spanish expatriate sportspeople in the Philippines
Expatriate football managers in Puerto Rico
Expatriate football managers in Thailand
Expatriate football managers in the Philippines